Narcoterrorism, in its original context, is understood to refer to the attempts of narcotics traffickers to influence the policies of a government or a society through violence and intimidation, and to hinder the enforcement of anti-drug laws by the systematic threat or use of such violence. As with most definitions of terrorism, it typically only refers to non-state actors.

Description 
Pablo Escobar's violence in his dealings with the Colombian government is probably one of the most known and best documented examples of narcoterrorism. The term itself was coined by former President Fernando Belaúnde Terry of Peru in 1983 when describing terrorist attacks against his nation's anti-narcotics police. The term has become a subject of controversy, largely due to its use in discussing violent opposition to the US government's War on Drugs.

The term is being increasingly used for terrorist organizations that engage in drug trafficking activity to fund their operations and gain recruits and expertise. Such organizations include FARC, ELN, AUC in Colombia, PCP-SL in Peru, Hamas, Hezbollah, and the Taliban.

A 2013 Congressional Research Service report noted that in 2003, the Drug Enforcement Administration (DEA) reported that 14 of 36 (39%) of the groups designated by the U.S. as foreign terrorist organizations "were involved 'to some degree' in illicit narcotics activity" while in fiscal year 2010, the U.S. Department of Justice (DOJ) "reported that 29 of the top 63 international drug syndicates, identified as such on the consolidated priority organization target (CPOT) list, were associated with terrorists."

In 2000 the U.S. began funding, continued under the U.S. Bush administration, of Plan Colombia, intending to eradicate drug crops and to act against drug lords accused of engaging in narcoterrorism, including among them the leaders of the Marxist FARC and the AUC paramilitary forces. The U.S. government is funding large-scale drug eradication campaigns and supporting Colombian military operations, seeking the extradition of commanders.

Although al-Qaeda is often said to finance its activities through drug trafficking, the 9/11 Commission Report notes that "while the drug trade was a source of income for the Taliban, it did not serve the same purpose for al Qaeda, and there is no reliable evidence that bin Laden was involved in or made his money through drug trafficking."  The organization gains most of its finances through donations, particularly those by "wealthy Saudi individuals".

Critics of the prohibition of drugs say that it is this prohibition itself which funds terrorism.

Examples

Areas or countries that have active or historical narcoterrorism or narco-war include:
 Syria, wherein the ruling al-Assad family has sponsored various militant groups that controls territories in Lebanon and Syria to finance the world's largest multi-billion dollar drug industry. Assad regime support the drug trafficking operations of militant group Hezbollah, which are vital for the group's finances.
 Afghanistan, to fund operations with sales of opium and heroin in the Afghanistan War
 Brazil, has several organized and trained groups that dominate territories, carry out offensives against state and federal security forces, control the clandestine market for drugs, weapons and ammunition and apply violence through psychological, communal and indiscriminate terrorism against the civilian population.
 Colombia  which have influential right-wing paramilitary "narco-terrorists", Clan del Golfo, Los Rastrojos, The Black Eagles and left-wing revolutionary guerrillas Popular Liberation Army.
 India's D-Company, a Mumbai-based crime syndicate which carried out the 1993 Bombay bombings. Said to be involved in large-scale drug trafficking via their contacts in Pakistani intelligence.
 Kosovo, during the civil war in 1999. Kosovo Liberation Army (KLA) was using "Narcoterrorism" for financing its operations.
 Lebanon – Hezbollah is said to derive its income from drug trafficking operations in both the Middle East and Latin America. According to a research conducted by the Abba Eban Institute as part of an initiative called Janus Initiative, Hezbollah makes a profit in the cocaine smuggling market to leverage it for terrorist activities. Hezbollah operatives are overseeing illicit finance and drug trafficking activities, moving about $200 million a month.
 Mexico, drug cartels and gangs Sinaloa Cartel - Gente Nueva, Los Zetas, Jalisco New Generation Cartel, La Línea (gang), La Resistencia (gang), Los Mexicles, Los Pelones, Artistas Asesinos, Barrio Azteca
 United Kingdom (Northern Ireland), where loyalist paramilitaries like the Ulster Volunteer Force are believed to be involved in drug dealing.
Peru left-wing revolutionary guerrillas Shining Path
 The Islamic Movement of Uzbekistan is said to fund itself through heroin trafficking.
 Sweden, in the form of a large quantity of gang related bombings, in retaliation to law enforcement, and other gangs and civilians. Bombings in Sweden.
 Venezuela, in the form of the Cartel of the Suns, among others. See generally Illegal drug trade in Venezuela.

Narcoterrorism in Colombia 

During the 1984–1993 period Colombia was known as one of the countries that suffered a number of terrorist attacks at the hands of narcotic traffickers. Belisario Betancourt, Virgilio Barco and Cesar Gaviria were three Colombian presidents that constantly battled against drug cartels, especially the one known as Los Extraditables led by Pablo Escobar Gaviria and Gonzalo Rodriguez Gacha. A number of crimes by “Los Extraditables”, also known as the Medellin Cartel were due to their constant battles against the government law.

History 

Pablo Escobar was elected as a representative as an alternative congress delegate, but allegations from politicians, the newspaper “El Espectador” and the minister of justice declared him a drug trafficker and he was eventually dismissed from Congress on January 4, 1984.

On April 30, 1984, a motorcycle gunman from the Medellin Cartel killed the minister of Justice Rodrigo Lara Bonilla. On November 6, 1985 the 19th of April Movement (Marxist guerrillas) sieged the palace of Justice in order to hold all supreme magistrates hostage. The organized military reaction caused the building to burn resulting in the deaths of 91 people, 11 of which were judges. Although the M-19 denies being funded from outside sources, multiple sources say the Medellin Cartel funded them. Additionally, numerous bombs detonated across the country, the most memorable bomb being the one that brought down Avianca Flight 203 during its flight over Soacha Cundinamarca resulting in 107 dead in 1989.

In Colombian history, the FARC were initially major enemies of the drug cartels. The MAS (Muerte a los secuestradores - Death to the kidnappers) was a group created by the most eminent members of the Cali cartel, including Escobar and Ochoa against the guerrillas who had kidnapped one of Ochoa's sister. The MAS was responsible for the deaths of 500 members of the Patriotic Union, a political party that emerged from the demobilization of part of the FARC in the 1990s. Significantly, it is worth recalling that Medellin cartel refused to buy coca from peasants living in areas under FARC control. From then on, even when there was evidence of collaboration between FARC and the drug traffickers, these connections were described as « temporary alliances ».

President Alvaro Uribe, who was elected on the idea of waging an all-out war against the FARC, over-emphasized the link between drugs and the FARC as well as the terrorist nature of the guerilla group in a post 2001 context: “(Álvaro Uribe) increasingly equated the guerrillas with drug traffickers and terrorists” . This policy has provoked much criticism which has enriched the debate on the nature of the conflict in Colombia, and consequently on the character of the FARC.

See also
Anti-Narcotics Force
Drug cartel
Illegal drug trade
Terruqueo

References

External links
The Drug War in Mexico: By Any Other Name it's Terrorism, by Barnard R. Thompson (MexiData.info)
The Narco-terror Trap, by Ginger Thompson (ProPublica)

Special-interest terrorism
Illegal drug trade